Laubwand is a mountain of Bavaria, Germany.

Mountains of the Alps
Mountains of Bavaria
Berchtesgaden Alps